A whaler is a specialized kind of ship designed for whaling.

Whaler may also refer to:

Boston Whaler, a brand of motorboat
Bronze whaler, a large shark
Creek whaler, a requiem shark
Whaler (album), a 1994 album by Sophie B. Hawkins
"The Whaler," a song on the 2007 album The Alchemy Index Vols. I & II by the band Thrice.
The Whaler, predecessor to the BK Big Fish, a sandwich at the restaurant chain Burger King
Montagu whaler, a boat used in some navies
Whaler (surname), people with this name

See also
For a list of people in the whaling industry, see :Category:People in whaling
Waler or Waler horse, an Australian breed of horse
Whalers (disambiguation)
Whaleboat, the small craft from which the whales were harpooned